Brøstad Church is a parish church of the Church of Norway in Dyrøy Municipality in Troms og Finnmark county, Norway. It is located in the village of Brøstadbotn. It is one of the churches for the Dyrøy parish which is part of the Senja prosti (deanery) in the Diocese of Nord-Hålogaland. The white, wooden church was built in a long church style in 1937 using plans drawn up by the architects Bersvend Thoresen Elvevold and Martin Jakobsen. The church seats about 180 people.

History
The church was built and consecrated in 1937. The long church building has a tall tower over the main entrance. The choir is on the northeast end of the building and it is raised up a few steps from the main nave. In 1997, the church was renovated using plans by the architect Ottar Holtermann.

See also
List of churches in Nord-Hålogaland

References

Dyrøy
Churches in Troms
Wooden churches in Norway
20th-century Church of Norway church buildings
Churches completed in 1937
1937 establishments in Norway
Long churches in Norway